Kateryna Ihorivna Kukhar (born 18 January 1982, Kyiv) is a Ukrainian prima ballerina of the National Opera of Ukraine. Merited Artiste of Ukraine (since 2012). People's Artiste of Ukraine (since 2018).

Biography
She started ballet lessons at the age of five. Without a qualifying round, Kateryna was invited to be part of an already established gymnastics group at the local youth center – the Palace of Pioneers.

In 1992, she entered Kyiv State Ballet School, formerly known as Kyiv Choreographic College (class of Tatiana Tayakina, People's Artiste of the USSR). After just two years of studies, Kateryna was awarded a diploma of the 2nd Ukrainian Festival of Arts «Всі ми діти твої, Україно».

In 1997, Kateryna won the prize at the International Dance Competition Prix de Lausanne and was invited to do internship in Lausanne, Switzerland.

At the age of 16, Kateryna made her first appearance as Masha in the “Nutcracker” ballet at the world-famous Bunka Kaikan Concert Hall in Japan. Valeriy Petrovich Kovtun, the choreographer who was working in Japan at that time, trusted the young ballerina to play the part.

In 1999, she graduated with high honors and distinction from Kyiv State Ballet School under the tutelage of the principle, Tatyana Alekseevna Tayakina, the People's Artiste of the USSR.

In the course of her career, Kateryna Kukhar has had support and collaboration of the following ballet teachers, People's Artistes of Ukraine and the USSR: Valery Kovtun, Lyudmila Smorgacheva, Nikolai Pryadchenko, Eleonora Steblyak, Raisa Hilko, Elvira Tarasova, Abdyev Recepmyrat.

Among Kateryna's ballet partners are Aleksandr Stoyanov, Leonid Sarafanov, Joseph Gatti, Bakhtiyar Adamjan, Eris Nezha, a principal dancer at the Paris Opéra Garnier, Quer Jérémy-Loup; a principal dancer at Teatro alla Scala, Claudio Coviello.

Prima Ballerina of the National Opera of Ukraine 
In 1999 after graduating from Kyiv State Ballet School, Kateryna received invitations to work in Madrid Royal Theater, Japanese National Ballet and the National Opera of Ukraine. The ballerina accepted the proposal to join the troupe of the National Opera of Ukraine. She has toured Europe, Canada, United States, Japan, Korea, China and other countries. She is a jury member of international ballet competitions and festivals. She is an international dance instructor. At the National Opera of Ukraine, Kateryna dances leading roles in virtually the entire repertoire.

Festivals and Gala Concerts 
Kateryna has taken part in many international festivals, including but not limited to “Aoyama Ballet Festival” (Japan), “Fresh Ballerina Festival” (Japan), International Festival of Modern Choreography (Ukraine), the Serge Lifar Festival, “IV Miedzynarodowa gala baletowa” (Poland), “Days of Culture” Andorra – Ukraine (Kyiv), Ohrid International Festival (Macedonia).

After Serge Lifar, Kateryna Kukhar was the first Ukrainian ever to be invited to Paris Ballet Conservatory to be a member of the jury at the State exam.

Gala concerts
2010 – “Stars of the World Ballet” (Donetsk);

2011 – “Gala Ballet Helps Japan” (Berlin);

2011 – “Ukraine-Poland” (Krakow);

2012 – “Stars of the World Ballet” (Odessa);

2012 – First International Art Festival;

2013 – Anniversary evening of Andris Liepa (Chelyabinsk and Saint Petersburg, Oktyabrskiy Big Concert Hall);

2013 – Gala concert “Ballet Masterpieces” of Faruh Ruzimatov in Japan;

2015 – Member of the jury at the International Ballet Festival-Competition Tanzolimp in Berlin;

2015 – International Ballet Festival in Riga, the 20th Anniversary edition;

2015–2016 – Member of the jury at the Seoul International Ballet Competition;

2016 – Gala concert in Seoul at the International Ballet Competition;

2016 – “Festival Internacional de la Cultura Maya”;

2017 – Ballet gala nights at Augsburg and Stockholm;

2017 – Grand Gala “Elisa y amigos” in Mexico.

Jury member at international competitions
Member of the jury at the Paris Conservatory (Conservatoire National Supérieur de Musique et de Danse de Paris)

Honorary member of the jury at the international competition “Tanzolymp” in 2015, 2019, 2020, 2021.

Honorary member of the jury at Seoul International Dance Competition in 2015 and 2016.

The head of the jury at "Natalia Skorulskaya all-Ukrainian Assembly of Dance" 2016–2019.

Kateryna is a guest of honor at the closing gala concerts at international competitions.

She is an invited artiste for the final gala concerts at international competitions. International teacher of ballet workshops at international competitions. Member of the jury at Conservatoire national supérieur de musique et de danse de Paris in 2018.

International educational activities and workshops 
2017 and 2018 – workshops on classical ballet lesson and duet at the Conservatoire national supérieur de musique et de danse de Paris.

2018 – workshop on classical ballet lesson in the US at the International Ballet Theater.

Member of the panel of judges for Dancing with the Stars 
In 2017, Kateryna got an invitation from the 1+1 TV Channel to become one of the judges at the Ukrainian version of “Dancing with the Stars” TV show (“Танці з Зірками”), together with Dmitry Monatik and Vlad Yama. In 2018, she was invited again to be a judge in Season 2. Kateryna was a member of the panel of judges for the show in Season 4 (2017), Season 5 (2018), Season 6 (2019) and Season 8 (2021). She was also a guest judge for Season 7 (2020).

A member of the selection committee at National Opera of Ukraine 
In 2020 and 2021, Kateryna Kukhar was invited to take the honorary post of a member of the selection committee at the country's first theater, the National Opera of Ukraine.

Presidential Scholarship Commission 
In 2021, Katerina Kukhar became a member of the Presidential Scholarship Commission.

Le Palais des Congrès in Paris 
In 2014, Prima Ballerina Kateryna Kukhar was invited to the Palais des Congrès in Paris to perform the role of Juliet with her partner, People's Artiste of Ukraine Aleksandr Stoyanov in the “Romeo and Juliet” ballet. The Concert Hall seats 3723 people. Performances were sold-out. The pair of Kateryna and Aleksandr alternated with the pair of principal dancers of the Mariinsky Theater Evgenia Obraztsova and her partner. During one week at the Palais des Congrès, the dancers performed six shows for the French audience. Each pair did three shows. Each night was a full house and stunning success.

Duet with Aleksandr Stoyanov 
The duet with the People's Artiste of Ukraine, the principal dancer of the National Opera of Ukraine, Aleksandr Stoyanov formed in 2006. Their first joint performance at the National Opera of Ukraine was “The Nutcracker” ballet. A few months later, they went on tour to China with the performances of “Giselle”, “The Sleeping Beauty”, “Swan Lake”, “Romeo and Juliet”. Today, their repertoire includes almost all classical and neoclassical productions of the National Opera of Ukraine. London ballet critic Maggie Foer called the duet “the most beautiful ballet couple in Europe”. In 2011, they participated in Vladimir Malakhov's Charity Gala to help Japan after the Fukushima events. In 2013, Farukh Ruzimatov invited Kateryna and Aleksandr to his Gala Concert in Japan titled “Ballet Masterpieces”. The same year, Andris Liepa invited them to dance at his anniversary event during the Russia and Kazakhstan tour. In 2016, they participated in the Mayan Culture Festival in Mexico along with the principal dancers of the Deutsche Oper Berlin\Berlin Opera, the Bolshoi Theater and the New York City Ballet. For years, Kateryna and Aleksandr have been the favorites of the Ukrainian audiences with their performances being sold-out each time.

Repertoire 
 Romeo and Juliet – Juliet
 La Sylphide – The Sylph
 Giselle – Giselle
 Don Quixote – Kitri
 Swan Lake – Odette, Odile
 The Nutcracker – Masha
 Le Corsaire – Gulnara
 Viennese Waltz – Aneli
 The Sleeping Beauty – Princess Aurora
 Cinderella – Cinderella
 Chipolino – Radish
 The Little Mermaid – Little Mermaid
 The Lord of Borisfen – Octavia
 Forest Song – Mavka
 The Wedding of Figaro – Susanna
 Vikings – Princess Elizavetta
 Kapelia – Swanilda
 Daniella – Sophie
 Caprices – Dream
 Snow White – Snow White
 Scheherazade – Zobeide

Other works
 “Class-concert” by Asaf Messerer
 “Classical pas de deux” by George Balanchine
 “About love” by Anatoliy Shaker
 “Simple things” by Radu Poklitaru
 “The butterfly” by Filippo Taglioni
 “Blind ballerina” by Leonid Yakobson
 “Tarantella” by George Balanchine
 “Children of the night” by Alexander Abdukarimov

Film, Television 
2019 – “Velyki Vuiky”, TV series – sorceress

2020 – “Viddana” (“Felix Austria”), feature film – Felix's mother

Recognitions and Awards 
2012 – Honorary title of Merited Artiste of Ukraine

2016 – The Order of Princess Olga of the 3rd degree

2017 – Special award “Pride of Ukraine”

2018 – Honorary title of People's Artiste of Ukraine

2019 – Person of the Year. “Ukrainian Idol” Award

2021 – Viva Awards. Kateryna Kukhar and Aleksandr Stoyanov: charity

Kateryna Kukhar has also won awards for International Competitions and Festivals participation, including but not limited to
 International Choreography Festival (Berlin, 2015)
 International Festival of Modern Choreography (Kyiv, 2000)
 High honors for participation in the 1st International Festival “Dance of the XXI Century (1998)
 International Festival «Aoyama Ballet Festival» and «Fresh Ballerina Festival» (both in Japan, 1997)
 Prizewinner of the International competition of young ballet dancers «Prix de Lausanne» (Switzerland, 1997)

Kyiv State Ballet School 
In 2020 Kateryna Kukhar was appointed a director of Kyiv State Ballet School, formerly known as Kyiv State Choreographic College – a professional ballet school.

Personal life 
Kateryna Kukhar is married to a principal dancer of National Opera of Ukraine, Aleksandr Stoyanov.

Aleksandr Stoyanov, People's Artiste of Ukraine, is a prizewinner and a jury member of International competitions. An artiste of the highest caliber, actively performing at the grandest venues around the globe. He is known for his positive energy, his high-flying leaps and hovering jumps. His emotional expressions and complete commitment to the dance inspire the audiences while creating a genuine celebration on stage. Among Aleksandr Stoyanov's dance partners are Kateryna Kukhar, Yana Salenko, Anna Nikulina, Petra Conti and many others. Due to his initiative and guidance Ukrainian ballet is advancing today. By his invitation, the brightest stars of the ballet world from all over come visit Ukraine; the best ballet festivals happen on Ukrainian stages, “BALLET OPEN SPACE” being one of them; the most sensational ballet opening nights take place, like “The Children of the Night” and “Touch of Illusion”. His ballet soirées, fundraisers and charitable events, festivals and first night openings bring real magic and inspiration.

Kateryna and Aleksandr have two children: their son Timur and daughter Anastasia.

See also
Dance in Ukraine

References

External links
Profile at National opera of Ukraine site

1982 births
Living people
Ukrainian ballerinas
Ukrainian ballet dancers
Recipients of the title of Merited Artist of Ukraine
Recipients of the Order of Princess Olga, 3rd class
Recipients of the title of People's Artists of Ukraine
20th-century ballet dancers
21st-century ballet dancers